KUBD-LP, VHF analog channel 11, was a low power CBS/Ion Television-affiliated television station licensed to Kodiak, Alaska, United States. The station was owned by Ketchikan Television.

KUBD-LP was available only over-the-air; it was not available on Kodiak Island cable system GCI, which opted for Anchorage CBS affiliate KAUU instead.

KUBD-LP's license was canceled by the Federal Communications Commission on July 20, 2021, as the station did not obtain a license for digital operation prior to the July 13 deadline.

See also
KUBD (TV)

CBS network affiliates
UBD-LP
Television channels and stations established in 2002
2002 establishments in Alaska
Defunct television stations in the United States
Television channels and stations disestablished in 2021
2021 disestablishments in Alaska
UBD-LP